The Lady and the Reaper is a 2009 Spanish 3D imaging animated short film created by Javier Recio Gracía and produced by Kandor Graphics and  Green Moon. It was nominated for an Academy Award for Best Animated Short Film and won the Goya Award for Best Animated Short of 2009. It was also included in the Animation Show of Shows.

Plot
An old lady, who lives alone in the countryside, is looking forward to death so that she can meet her dead husband. When the Reaper arrives and she is about to reach the afterlife, she is pulled away from the Reaper by a smug doctor. The Reaper and the doctor fight fiercely, and eventually medicine wins. The impatient Reaper leaves, but the lady is not willing to postpone the encounter with her husband, electrocuting herself with the defibrillator in water, much to the dismay and anger of the Reaper.

References

External links 
 
 

2009 3D films
2009 short films
2009 films
Spanish animated short films
Spanish black comedy films
Spanish animated films
Spanish short films
3D short films
2000s Spanish films